Emmanuel Olisadebe (born 22 December 1978) is a former professional footballer who played as a striker.

He began his career with Jasper United, going on to have a successful career with Polonia Warsaw where in 2000 he won the Ekstraklasa, Ekstraklasa Cup and Polish SuperCup. He also played in Greece, Cyprus, England and China.

Born in Nigeria, he attracted the attention of the Poland national team after he was eligible for Polish citizenship. He scored 11 international goals in 25 caps between 2000 and 2004, and participated in the 2002 FIFA World Cup. He was the first black player in the history of the Poland national team.

Club career

Polonia Warsaw
Olisadebe began playing for Polonia Warsaw during the 1997–98 Ekstraklasa season where in his first season he played in 13 league games. During his time in the Polish capital he helped them secure their first championship title in 50 years in the 1999–2000 season, scoring 12 goals in the process. He also won the League Cup and the Super Cup that season.

Panathinaikos
Olisadebe moved to Panathinaikos where he scored 24 goals in 74 matches. In 2004, he helped the club win the title for the first time in 7 years by scoring all the winning goals in the last three of four games of the championship. He also won the cup that year, making it a double. However, during his time at Panathinaikos he suffered an injury that required surgery in Greece.

Portsmouth
On 4 January 2006, he joined Portsmouth until the end of the 2005–06 season. He made his debut ten days later, replacing Richard Hughes after 61 minutes of an eventual 1–0 Premier League defeat to Everton at Fratton Park. A week later he made his only other appearance for the club, playing the final 37 minutes of a 5–0 defeat at Birmingham City, this time in place of Vincent Péricard.

His contract was terminated after four months, at which point he moved to Skoda Xanthi, where he played for nine matches.

APOP Kinyras Peyias
He then featured for APOP Kinyras Peyia FC where he played in the 2007–08 season where he played in 17 games scoring 6 goals.

Henan Construction
In 2008, he was offered a deal with Chinese Super League club Henan Construction. In his second match with Henan, the third round of 2008 Chinese Super League against Liaoning, he scored two goals. In first season at Henan he scored 12 goals in 26 games in the Chinese super league.

On 27 September, Olisadebe scored the opening goal for Henan in a 2–0 win over Shanghai Shenhua to regain lead in the league less than ten minutes before injuring his knee. Initial diagnosis showed that he had torn his cruciate ligament of the left knee, and the injury could end his entire football career. Further results confirmed that he injured his patellar ligament and would only miss the rest of the season.
He was nominated for the MVP awards two years consecutively only to be 2nd in both occasions. Due to his performance he has been granted by the government of Henan province citizenship.

International career
Though Nigerian by birth, Olisadebe became a Polish citizen in 2000 and was selected by the Poland national team. He scored eight goals in ten qualification matches as coach Jerzy Engel's team reached the 2002 FIFA World Cup, their first since 1986, gaining one vote for 2001 FIFA World Player of the Year. He netted their second of three goals in a victory over Norway on 1 September which confirmed qualification.

Olisadebe scored Poland's first goal of their 2002 FIFA World Cup campaign in a 3–1 victory against the United States in Daejeon in the last group match. However, Poland did not progress to the second round and Olisadebe would not score again for Poland.  Jerzy Engel, the national coach who brought Olisadebe into the fold, resigned following Poland’s exit from the World Cup, and barring a handful of sporadic appearances that resignation ended Olisadebe’s association with the national team as well.

Personal life
Olisadebe supported the "Let’s Kick Racism out of the Stadiums" campaign, organised by the Polish Never Again Association. He married a Polish woman, Beata Smolińska, in 2001 and they remained married until 2017; they parted on friendly terms. Olisadebe retired from football in 2012 and eventually moved back to Nigeria. Although he admits to sometimes missing Poland, he prefers life in his original homeland of Nigeria, where he now profits from housing construction.

Career statistics

Club

International

Scores and results list Poland's goal tally first, score column indicates score after each Olisadebe goal.

Honours
Polonia Warsaw
Ekstraklasa: 1999–2000
Polish SuperCup: 2000
Polish League Cup: 2000

Panathinaikos
Superleague Greece: 2003–04
Greek Cup: 2003–04
Individual
Polish footballer of the Year: 2001
Fourth-best Polish sportsman of the Year: 2002
Nominated for the FIFA World Player of the Year: 2002

References

External links
 Player profile for the 2002 World Cup at BBC Sport
 Player profile at 90minut.pl (Polish)
 Player profile at Sodasoccer.com (Chinese)
 Player stats at Sohu.com (Chinese)

1978 births
Living people
2002 FIFA World Cup players
Polish footballers
Poland international footballers
Nigerian footballers
Sportspeople from Warri
Naturalized citizens of Poland
Nigerian emigrants to Poland
Association football forwards
Jasper United F.C. players
Polonia Warsaw players
Panathinaikos F.C. players
Portsmouth F.C. players
Xanthi F.C. players
APOP Kinyras FC players
Henan Songshan Longmen F.C. players
Vyzas F.C. players
Veria F.C. players
Ekstraklasa players
Super League Greece players
Premier League players
Cypriot First Division players
Chinese Super League players
Football League (Greece) players
Expatriate footballers in Greece
Expatriate footballers in England
Expatriate footballers in Cyprus
Expatriate footballers in China
Polish expatriate footballers
Polish expatriate sportspeople in Greece
Polish expatriate sportspeople in England
Polish expatriate sportspeople in Cyprus
Polish expatriate sportspeople in China
Nigerian expatriate footballers
Nigerian expatriate sportspeople in Greece
Nigerian expatriate sportspeople in England
Nigerian expatriate sportspeople in Cyprus
Nigerian expatriate sportspeople in China